Aleksandar Mikijelj (Cyrillic: Александар Микијељ, born 5 February 1979) is a Montenegrin retired footballer, who finished his career with FK Bokelj.

Club career
After starting his career at the most prestigious Montenegrin club FK Budućnost Podgorica, in 1999, he moved to his hometown club FK Bokelj to gain experience. In 2003, he moved to a Serbian SuperLiga club Borac Čačak. After spells in other Montenegrin clubs like FK Grbalj, FK Mogren and OFK Petrovac, since 2013 he is playing in the Montenegrin Second League club FK Bokelj.

International career
In 2009, Mikijelj received calls to represent the Montenegro national football team, but did not made an appearance.

References

External sources
 

1979 births
Living people
People from Kotor
Association football defenders
Serbia and Montenegro footballers
Montenegrin footballers
FK Mogren players
FK Budućnost Podgorica players
FK Bokelj players
FK Borac Čačak players
OFK Grbalj players
OFK Petrovac players
Second League of Serbia and Montenegro players
First League of Serbia and Montenegro players
Montenegrin First League players
Montenegrin Second League players